Jake Williams (born 1974) is a British electronic music producer and remixer, who currently records as Rex the Dog. Rex the Dog currently releases on Kompakt Records. As Rex the Dog, Williams is a proponent of DIY electronics and performs live with a self-built modular synthesizer. Williams first came to public attention as JX in 1994 following a recording contract with Hooj Choons, a United Kingdom dance independent record label. Williams has also recorded as Mekka and wrote the song "Bullet in the Gun" as part of Paul Oakenfold's collective Planet Perfecto.

Chart success
JX achieved two top 10 singles in the UK; and Australia. "There's Nothing I Won't Do" (1996) was the highest-charting single in the UK, reaching number 4. Williams also charted in the UK as writer and producer on Planet Perfecto's "Bullet in the Gun", reaching number 7 in 2000.

Discography

Studio albums

Singles

As JX

As Rex the Dog

References

External links
 Discogs biography
 Rex the Dog homepage

Living people
English electronic musicians
English dance musicians
Eurodance musicians
English record producers
English trance musicians
Remixers
Date of birth missing (living people)
1974 births
Planet Perfecto members